Episcepsis capysca is a moth of the family Erebidae. It was described by William Schaus in 1910. It is found in Costa Rica.

Description
Legs and palpi dark grey streaked with white; forecoxae with white streak. Head ochreous spotted with black; the frons blackish with a few white scales. Collar brown black, with some ochreous shading in front and laterally. Thorax brownish black; a grey line on patagia. Abdomen blue black; a ventral row of white spots. Primaries dark olive brown; the veins and a streak in cell and one below it grey; the apex broadly snowy white. Secondaries bluish black; a semihyaline (almost glass-like) streak below cell, slightly in it, and also beyond it shortly.

Wingspan 30 mm.

References

External links
 
 E. capysca at BHL
 E. capysca at BOLD
 E. capysca at EOL

Euchromiina
Moths described in 1910